The following is a list of current records for Amor asteroids.

External links 
 List of Amor minor planets

Asteroid records